Zulay Henao (born March 22, 1979) is a Colombian-American film and television actress. She has co-starred in a number of films such as Illegal Tender (2007), Fighting (2009), Takers (2010), Boy Wonder (2011), Hostel: Part III, The Single Moms Club (2014), True Memoirs of an International Assassin (2016). In 2014 she began starring as one of the lead characters in the Oprah Winfrey Network series, If Loving You Is Wrong.

Early life
Henao was born in Medellín, Antioquia, Colombia. She and her family emigrated to New Jersey.  After high school she served three years with the U.S. Army. Henao enrolled at the New York Conservatory for Dramatic Arts to study acting.

Career
Henao appeared in two small films, and in 2007 made her television debut in an episode of Lifetime drama series, Army Wives. In the same year she also guest-starred on Law & Order: Special Victims Unit. Also in 2007, Henao had supporting roles in films Illegal Tender and Feel the Noise. In 2008 she starred in the horror film Grizzly Park where she met her best friend and co star Julie Skon, who was pregnant with her first child Layla White during the filming, and appeared opposite Charles S. Dutton in a Lifetime Original Movie Racing for Time.

In 2009, Henao had the female lead role in the sports film Fighting alongside Channing Tatum, and also appeared in the science fiction film S. Darko. In 2011 she starred in the independent psychological-thriller film, Boy Wonder. Henao also has appeared in Takers (2010) and Hostel: Part III (2011).

In 2013, Henao began starring as regular on the Oprah Winfrey Network sitcom, Love Thy Neighbor. She left the show after a single season. Henao starred opposite Nia Long, Wendi McLendon-Covey, and Amy Smart in the 2014 film The Single Moms Club, directed by Tyler Perry. She later was cast in same role of television adaptation of film, called If Loving You Is Wrong. Also in 2014, Henao was cast as adult film legend Vanessa del Rio, in an untitled biopic directed by Thomas Mignone. She later left the project and was replaced by Vivian Lamolli. In 2019, she had a recurring roles in The Oath and Stumptown.

Personal life 
Henao is in a relationship with Kevin Connolly. Together they had a baby girl, Kennedy Cruz, in early June 2021.

Filmography

Television

References

External links

1979 births
21st-century American actresses
21st-century Colombian actresses
American film actresses
American television actresses
Colombian emigrants to the United States
Colombian film actresses
Colombian television actresses
Hispanic and Latino American actresses
Living people
People from Medellín
United States Army soldiers
Women in the United States Army